Officials for the 2010 FIFA World Cup are selected from a pool of 30 trios of referees and assistant referees announced by the association football governing body, FIFA, on 5 February 2010. The final cut was selected from a group of 38 referees revealed in October 2008, themselves whittled down from an initial group of 54 selected for the Refereeing Assistance Programme in 2007. From the quarter-finals onwards, the pool of referees was reduced to 19.

Selection process
In 2007, the FIFA Executive Committee set up the Refereeing Assistance Programme (RAP) to help prepare the referees in contention to officiate at the 2010 World Cup; 54 were selected to make up the initial group. Over the following months, they were assessed based on their performances at FIFA tournaments, RAP seminars and in their domestic leagues. In September 2008, 53 of the original 54 referees attended an "Elite Referee" seminar in Zürich, Switzerland, where their technical, physical and mental abilities were analysed. The results were presented to the FIFA Referees' Committee, who preselected 38 trios of referees and their assistants on 22 October.

From this group of 38, ten trios – representing all six confederations – were selected to referee at the 2009 FIFA Confederations Cup, hosted by South Africa as preparation for the World Cup 12 months later. This assignment was viewed by FIFA as part of the referees' assessment, to ensure that they are prepared for the technical and physical demands of the World Cup in South Africa.

The final 30 trios of officials were announced at a meeting of the FIFA Referees Committee in Zürich on 5 February 2010. The trios were assessed using the same criteria as for the original cut. Following their selection, each official underwent FIFA's pre-competition medical assessment (PCMA) at the Schulthess Clinic in Zürich between 25 February and 6 March.

However, on 27 May 2010, two referees – Carlos Amarilla and Mohamed Benouza – and their assistants were removed from the final list, following the assistant referees' failure in the standard fitness tests, the same tests as those held in Zurich. Uruguayan referee Martín Vázquez and his assistant referees were called up as a replacement trio.

For the quarter-finals onwards, FIFA trimmed their list of match officials, allowing 10 teams of referees to return home. The teams sent home were those of Roberto Rosetti (Italy), Jorge Larrionda (Uruguay), Stéphane Lannoy (France), Massimo Busacca (Switzerland), Martin Hansson (Sweden), Koman Coulibaly (Mali), Subkhiddin Mohd Salleh (Malaysia), Peter O'Leary (New Zealand), Martín Vázquez (Uruguay) and Joel Aguilar (El Salvador).

Officials

References

External links
 2010 FIFA World Cup South Africa Referees at FIFA.com

Officials